"Two Car Garage" is a song recorded by American country music artist B. J. Thomas.  It was released in November 1983 as the first single from his album The Great American Dream. The song reached No. 3 on the Billboard Hot Country Songs chart in February 1984 and No. 1 on the RPM Country Tracks chart in Canada. The song was written J. D. Martin and Gary Harrison.

Music video 
A music video for the song was produced and aired on CMT, Great American Country and The Nashville Network.

Chart performance

References 

1983 singles
B. J. Thomas songs
Columbia Records singles
Songs written by Gary Harrison
Songs written by J. D. Martin (songwriter)
1983 songs